Hugh Morton MacFarlane (1916–1968) was a Scottish footballer who played for Clyde, Dumbarton, Alloa Athletic and Celtic (wartime guest).

References

1916 births
Date of birth missing
1968 births
Date of death missing
Scottish footballers
Sportspeople from Rutherglen
Dumbarton F.C. players
Celtic F.C. wartime guest players
Clyde F.C. players
Alloa Athletic F.C. players
Scottish Football League players
Scottish Junior Football Association players
Rutherglen Glencairn F.C. players
Association football inside forwards
Association football central defenders
Footballers from South Lanarkshire